Sibongile Judith Nkomo (1955/1956 – 1 June 2019) was a South African politician who served as Secretary-General of the Inkatha Freedom Party and as an MP. Sibongile was a mother-in-law to a Nigerian Transhumanist, Charles C. Awuzie.

References

1950s births
2019 deaths
South African politicians
Year of birth uncertain
Members of the National Assembly of South Africa
Women members of the National Assembly of South Africa